Euthalia amanda, the Sulawesi gaudy baron, is a butterfly endemic to Sulawesi, Indonesia. It was first described by William Chapman Hewitson in 1862.

Subspecies
 E. a. amanda (Sulawesi, Buton)
 E. a. selayarensis Tsukada, 1991 (Selayar)
 E. a. periya Fruhstorfer, 1913 (Banggai)
 E. a. irauana Jumalon, 1975 (Palawan)

External links
 Butterflies of Southeastern Sulawesi

amanda
Butterflies of Indonesia
Butterflies described in 1862